Borsonia jaffa is a species of sea snail, a marine gastropod mollusk in the family Borsoniidae.

Description

Distribution
This marine species occurs off South Australia

References

 Cotton, B.C. 1947. Some Southern Australian Turridae. South Australian Naturalist 24(3): 13-16

jaffa
Gastropods described in 1947